Erwin Kern (August 23, 1888 – March 20, 1963) was a German track and field athlete who competed in the 1912 Summer Olympics. He was born in Pfirt and died in Schönau im Schwarzwald.

In 1912 he was eliminated in the semi-finals of the 100 metres competition. He was also a member of the German relay team which was disqualified in the final of the 4x100 metre relay competition after a fault with its second baton passing.

References

External links
profile

1888 births
1963 deaths
Sportspeople from Haut-Rhin
People from Alsace-Lorraine
German male sprinters
Olympic athletes of Germany
Athletes (track and field) at the 1912 Summer Olympics
World record setters in athletics (track and field)